The J. O. Westwood Medal is awarded every two years by the Royal Entomological Society (RES).

The criteria for the award are:

and the winner is chosen by a panel of senior and international RES Fellows.

The award was inaugurated in 2008, and is named in honour of the entomologist, John O. Westwood. Recipients are awarded a silver gilt medal and £1000.

Winners 

Past winners include:

References 

Awards established in 2008
Entomology